Fehtija Mosque is a mosque and former Catholic church located in the town of Bihać, Bosnia and Herzegovina. Built in 1266, it is the oldest gothic building in the country. It was originally built as a Catholic church dedicated to Saint Anthony of Padua, and was subsequently transformed into a mosque following the 1592 conquest of Bihać from Habsburg Croatia by the Ottomans. The building was originally accompanied by a monastery, which was also mentioned in a 13th-century charter of the Croatian nobility.

See also
 Islam in Bosnia and Herzegovina
 List of mosques in Bosnia and Herzegovina

References

External links

http://www.discoverbihac.ba/dzamija1.php 

Buildings and structures in Bihać
Ottoman mosques in Bosnia and Herzegovina
16th-century mosques
National Monuments of Bosnia and Herzegovina
Mosques completed in 1266
Former Roman Catholic church buildings
History of Bihać
Mosques converted from churches in the Ottoman Empire
Gothic architecture in Bosnia and Herzegovina
Medieval Bosnia and Herzegovina architecture